Isabelle "Izzy" Sinclair is a fictional character who appeared in the Doctor Who Magazine comic strip based on the long-running British science fiction television series Doctor Who. She was a companion of the Eighth Doctor.

Izzy was born on October 12, 1979 (the same day that the first issue of Doctor Who Weekly was published). However, she did not know where she was born, nor did she know who her biological parents were. She was adopted by Les and Sandra Sinclair, but because of her unknown ancestry, chose to call herself Izzy S (for "Izzy Somebody") instead.

Izzy was first introduced in End Game, which ran in issues #244-#247 of DWM, written by Alan Barnes and drawn by Martin Geraghty, where she was a 17-year-old science fiction fan and amateur paranormal investigator who lived in the town of Stockbridge, England. She was also a friend of Maxwell Edison, a UFO enthusiast who had encountered the Fifth Doctor several years before.

When Izzy first met the Doctor, she and Max had stolen an artifact that was being sought by the Doctor's old enemy, the Celestial Toymaker. The Toymaker had taken the entire town of Stockbridge into a pocket dimension and turned everyone into dolls save for Izzy and Max. The Doctor arrived in the midst of this, rescued his friends, defeated the Toymaker once again and took Izzy on board the TARDIS as his newest companion. Maxwell declined to travel with the Doctor. Izzy soon met and had many adventures alongside Fey Truscott-Sade. Fey is a trusted agent of Britain, working to protect its interests during the early days of World War 2.

Izzy had left Earth without telling her adoptive parents, but that did not concern her much as she was trying to escape what she felt was a too-mundane life. As a result, she revelled in the experience of travelling with the Doctor, even though it was usually dangerous. However, her vivacious and trusting nature eventually had tragic consequences. When the TARDIS was swallowed by a gigantic snake-like spacecraft called Ophidius, Izzy and the Doctor met Destrii, an amphibious alien with the characteristics of a humanoid fish. Destrii was being pursued by the group of aliens that controlled Ophidius, and gained Izzy's confidence only to switch bodies with her to evade capture. When Destrii (in Izzy's body) was apparently disintegrated, Izzy had to deal with the possibility that she would be in an alien body for the rest of her life. The Doctor tried to comfort her by telling her of the times he had awoken with a new body as well.

During her time in this body Izzy helped fight murderous artistic aliens in 1940s Mexico and made several friends who slightly restored her confidence. This was during the 'Day of the Dead' celebration so her new appearance went relatively unnoticed. She and the Doctor later traveled to a water world to check out her new physiology with allies; all were kidnapped by peace-loving Daleks.

Just as she began to adjust to her new body, Izzy was kidnapped by operatives of Destrii's mother, the Matriax Scalamanthia of the planet Oblivion, who wanted her "daughter" to prepare for her wedding by fighting a duel to the death. While trying to trace Izzy's whereabouts with the help of his former companion Fey, the Doctor discovered that Destrii was still alive due to the 'disintegration' beam having a secondary 'storage' function. He took Destrii to Oblivion to switch their bodies back. In the process, both Destrii and Izzy saw into each other's minds, and Destrii saw how finding out she had been adopted made Izzy withdraw emotionally, unable to trust herself or admit that she was a lesbian. Contrasting her life with Destrii made Izzy realize how fortunate she was to have a family that loved her. Finally coming to terms with who she was, Izzy asked the Doctor to take her back to Stockbridge so she could make amends to her adoptive parents. The Doctor dropped Izzy off at the point where she began travelling with him, so that from her parents' point of view, she had never left.

Izzy was the Eighth Doctor's most constant companion in the comic strip, appearing in nearly all of the Eighth Doctor's appearances between 1996 and 2003. Her time with the Doctor saw the coming and going of both Kroton and Fey as companions. An older Izzy made a cameo appearance in the last regular Eighth Doctor comic strip story, The Flood (DWM #353) and narrates part of the story. She also appears in the short story "Syntax" by David Bailey, published in the Big Finish Productions anthology Short Trips: Life Science, set during her time with the Doctor.

In the 2008/2009 Tenth Doctor strip The Stockbridge Child, Izzy is mentioned as having gone travelling around the world by Max who also says she found something "amazing" in Kabul but cannot reveal what before being interrupted by the Doctor's new companion Majenta. Izzy makes one more appearance in the 2016 story "The Stockbridge Showdown", published in DWM #500 and featuring the Twelfth Doctor and all his regular companions original to Doctor Who Magazine.

Appearances in other media
Izzy appears as a companion to the Eighth Doctor in the Big Finish Productions audio drama The Company of Friends, where she is portrayed by Jemima Rooper. This story sees her convince the Doctor to take her back to acquire a lost copy of a comic strip she was a fan of as a child, which leads to the discovery that the magazine in question was written by aliens and the issue was pulled because a fan of the future disliked a revelation about a key character in the comic.

References

External links

Comics characters introduced in 1996
Doctor Who comic strip characters
Doctor Who spin-off companions
Female characters in comics
Fictional lesbians
LGBT characters in comics